Frizzled-2 (Fz-2) is a protein that in humans is encoded by the FZD2 gene.

Members of the 'frizzled' gene family encode 7-transmembrane domain proteins that are receptors for Wnt signaling proteins.  The expression of the FZD2 gene appears to be developmentally regulated, with high levels of expression in fetal kidney and lung and in adult colon and ovary.

References

Further reading

External links

G protein-coupled receptors